Holidays in the Danger Zone: Places That Don't Exist is a five-part travel documentary, part of the Holidays in the Danger Zone series, produced and broadcast by BBC This World.  Written and presented by Simon Reeve, and produced by Will Daws and Iain Overton. It was first broadcast in May 2005, on BBC Two.

Episode 1: Somaliland
Episode 2: Trans-Dniester (Transnistria)
Episode 3: Taiwan (Republic of China)
Episode 4: South Ossetia and Abkhazia
Episode 5: Nagorno-Karabakh

In the series, Reeve visits a number of small breakaway states and unrecognised nations including Somaliland, recognised as part of Somalia, Transnistria, recognised as part of Moldova where Reeve was detained for 'spying' by the Federal Security Service (FSB), Nagorno-Karabakh, part of Azerbaijan. Reeve also visited Adjara, Abkhazia, and South Ossetia, all recognised by the United Kingdom as parts of Georgia (despite a regional crisis in 2004, Adjara is now under the full control of Georgia), and the Republic of China known as Taiwan.

The programme and its team were awarded a One World Broadcasting Trust Award in June 2005 for best popular feature.

See also
Holidays in the Danger Zone
Holidays in the Axis of Evil 
America Was Here
The Violent Coast
Rivers 
Meet the Stans

References

External links
Places That Don't Exist – at the BBC Four website

BBC television documentaries
BBC World News shows
Documentaries about politics